The Bon Secours Hospital, Dublin is a private hospital in Glasnevin, Dublin, Ireland. The hospital is part of Bon Secours Mercy Health. This includes sister hospitals in Cork, Galway, Limerick and Tralee. The hospital employs over 140 consultants and sees more than 130,000 patients per year.

History
The hospital at Glasnevin, which was designed by Jim Barrett, opened in 1951.

Services
The hospital has over 150 beds, including 135 in-patient beds.  There are 30 day case beds, 30 endoscopy beds and 6 oncology day spaces. The hospital has 4 major and 2 minor operating theatres. Services provided include surgery, oncology, cardiology, diagnostic imaging, nutrition and dietetics, histopathology, pharmacy, physiotherapy, and respiratory medicine.

Accreditation
The hospital was the first in Ireland to receive Joint Commission International accreditation.

See also
 Bon Secours Hospital, Cork
 Bon Secours Hospital, Galway
 Bon Secours Hospital, Tralee

References

Bon Secours Sisters
Hospitals established in 1951
Hospitals in Dublin (city)
1951 establishments in Ireland
Private hospitals in the Republic of Ireland
Catholic hospitals in Europe